California Law Review (also referred to as CLR) is the journal of the University of California, Berkeley, School of Law. It was established in 1912. The application process consists of an anonymous write-on competition, with grades playing no role in the consideration of membership. A personal statement is also considered.

CLR is ranked third and fifth among United States law journals in studies conducted by Washington & Lee University and the University of Oregon, respectively.

History 
California Law Review was the first student-run law review in the Western United States. It is the ninth-oldest surviving law review published in the United States.

A companion volume, the California Law Review Online, was launched in 2014, followed by a podcast in 2021. These publications feature shorter articles, essays, blogs, and audio content.

Notable alumni

Past editors and contributors have included

 Chief Justice Roger J. Traynor (former editor-in-chief), 
 Justice Kathryn Werdegar (former editor-in-chief)
 Justice Allen Broussard 
 Chief Justice Rose Bird 
 Ninth Circuit Judge Marsha Berzon
 Ambassador Jeff Bleich (former editor-in-chief)
 Former United States Solicitor General Theodore Olson
 Professor Christopher Schroeder (former editor-in-chief)
 Professor Barbara Armstrong, the first female law professor in the United States
 defense attorneys Tony Serra and Michael Tigar
 Los Angeles trial lawyer and author Merrill K. Albert (revising editor, 1955)
 Law librarian Rosamond Parma (manager, 1928-1935)

References

External links
 

American law journals
University of California, Berkeley
Publications established in 1912
General law journals
Bimonthly journals
Law in the San Francisco Bay Area
1912 establishments in California
Law journals edited by students